In Greek mythology, Aeginetes (Ancient Greek: Αἰγινήτου means 'the Aeginetan') was a son of Deritus, descendant of King Amyclas of Laconia. Through his son Pelias, Dereites was the ancestor of Patreus who founded Patras.

Note

References 

 Pausanias, Description of Greece with an English Translation by W.H.S. Jones, Litt.D., and H.A. Ormerod, M.A., in 4 Volumes. Cambridge, MA, Harvard University Press; London, William Heinemann Ltd. 1918. . Online version at the Perseus Digital Library
 Pausanias, Graeciae Descriptio. 3 vols. Leipzig, Teubner. 1903. Greek text available at the Perseus Digital Library.

Characters in Greek mythology